Caitríona Mary Balfe (born 4 October 1979) is an Irish actress, producer, and former fashion model. She is best known for her starring role as Claire Fraser in the Starz historical drama series Outlander (2014–present), for which she received a British Academy Scotland Award, an Irish Film and Television Award, two People's Choice Awards and three Saturn Awards. She also earned nominations for two Critics' Choice Television Awards and four Golden Globe Awards for Best Actress in a Television Series – Drama.

At age eighteen, while studying drama at the Dublin Institute of Technology, Balfe was offered work as a fashion model in Paris. For ten years, she was featured both in advertising campaigns and on runways for brands such as Chanel, Dolce & Gabbana, Alexander McQueen, Balenciaga, Givenchy, Bottega Veneta and Oscar de la Renta before refocusing on acting. She had leading roles in the web series The Beauty Inside (2012) and H+: The Digital Series (2012–2013), and appeared in the films Super 8 (2011), Now You See Me (2013), Escape Plan (2013), Money Monster (2016), Ford v Ferrari (2019) and Belfast (2021).

Early life 
Balfe was born in Dublin and grew up outside the village of Tydavnet, near Monaghan Town, in a family of seven. She is the fourth of five children. Her father was a retired Garda Sergeant. She went to Dublin Institute of Technology to study drama, before being spotted by a model scout.

Career

Modelling 

Balfe started modelling after she was scouted by an agent while she was collecting money for charity at a local shopping centre. At 18, after working as a model in Dublin for a few months, she caught the attention of a visiting Ford Models scout, who offered her the chance to work for them in Paris.

Balfe's modelling career highlights include opening and closing fashion shows for Chanel, Givenchy, Dolce & Gabbana, Moschino, Alberta Ferretti and Louis Vuitton. In a three-year period, she walked in more than 250 runway shows. At the height of her career, Balfe was considered to be among the twenty most in-demand models in the world.

Acting 
While living in New York, Balfe played the minor role of an employee of the magazine Runway in the 2006 film The Devil Wears Prada. In 2009, after a decade-long modelling career, Balfe returned to her initial career choice and moved from New York to Los Angeles, spending her first year and a half in the city exclusively taking acting classes, first at the Warner Loughlin Studios and then at the Sanford Meisner Center and the Judith Weston Studios. Balfe has appeared in the films Super 8, as the protagonist's mother, Now You See Me, as Michael Caine's character's wife, and Escape Plan, as the CIA lawyer that hires Sylvester Stallone's character.

In 2012 she portrayed Alex #34 in The Beauty Inside, a social film divided into six episodes telling the story of a man named Alex (Topher Grace) who wakes up in a different body every day. In 2013 she starred in the music videos for "First Fires" by British musician Bonobo and for "Chloroform" by French band Phoenix, the latter directed by Sofia Coppola.

Balfe was part of the main cast of the Warner Bros. web series H+: The Digital Series during 2012 and 2013, in which she played Breanna Sheehan, one of the executives of a biotechnology company that develops an implanted computer which allows people to be connected to the Internet 24 hours a day.

In September 2013, Balfe was cast as the lead character, Claire Beauchamp Randall Fraser, on the Starz television drama series Outlander, based on the novels written by Diana Gabaldon; the series premiered in August 2014. She plays a mid-20th-century nurse who is transported back in time to the war-torn mid-18th-century Scottish Highlands. Both the series and her performance have received critical acclaim, with Richard Lawson of Vanity Fair saying "it helps immensely that Balfe is such an appealing actress, [she] makes Claire a spirited, principled, genuinely heroic heroine". Tim Goodman of The Hollywood Reporter wrote that Balfe is "reason enough to watch; she's a confident actress who brings various shades to her character." James Poniewozik of Time labelled Balfe's portrayal as "wry, [and] infectiously engaging." Angelica Jade Bastién of The New York Times called Balfe "one of the most stunning actresses on television".

In December 2014, Entertainment Weekly named Balfe one of its 12 Breakout Stars of 2014; that month she was also voted "Woman Of The Year" at BBC America's Anglophenia Fan Favorites tournament.

In April 2015, Balfe received Best Actress in a Lead Role Drama and Rising Star Award nominations for the 12th Irish Film & Television Awards, and was named one of People magazine's "50 Most Beautiful People in the World". She won Saturn Awards for Best Actress on Television in 2015 and 2016. In November 2016, Balfe won the Scottish BAFTA award for Best Actress on Television and in February 2018 she won the Irish IFTA for Best Actress in a Lead Role Drama. Balfe also received four nominations for the Golden Globe Award for Best Actress – Television Series Drama for her role in Outlander.

Balfe co-starred in the film Money Monster (2016), directed by Jodie Foster and starring George Clooney and Julia Roberts. She played the head of PR of a company whose stock bottoms out, causing a man to lose all of his savings and subsequently take hostages on a live TV show. Eric Hills of The Movie Waffler wrote "But it's relative newcomer Balfe who leaves the greatest impression; she's magnetic, stealing scenes even when her character is only glimpsed reacting to the situation on a background monitor. Expect to see a lot more of this Irish actress in the coming years."

In 2019, Balfe had a recurring voice role as Tavra in the Netflix fantasy series The Dark Crystal: Age of Resistance. The series, which was a prequel to the 1982 fantasy film The Dark Crystal and produced by the Jim Henson Company, was released to critical acclaim. Also in 2019, she had a starring role opposite Matt Damon and Christian Bale in the sports drama film Ford v Ferrari. Balfe portrayed Mollie Miles, the wife of professional race car driver Ken Miles, a role which earned her an IFTA nomination for Best Actress in a Supporting Role. The film received universal acclaim upon release and was nominated for the Academy Award for Best Picture.

In 2021, Balfe had a co-starring role in Kenneth Branagh's semi-autobiographical film Belfast, for which she received critical acclaim. Critic Richard Lawson of Vanity Fair lauded Balfe for her "modest, affable performance". Her performance earned her nominations for the Screen Actors Guild Award, Golden Globe Award, Critics' Choice Movie Award, and British Academy Film Award for Best Supporting Actress. The film was nominated for Best Picture at the 94th Academy Awards. She has been a member of the Academy of Motion Picture Arts and Sciences in the Actors Branch since June 2022.

Personal life 
, Balfe is based in Glasgow, having previously lived in Los Angeles where she started acting professionally, and in New York City, Paris, London, Milan, Hamburg, and Tokyo while she worked as a model. In addition to her native English, she is a speaker of the Irish language and is conversant in French.

On 10 August 2019, Balfe married her longtime boyfriend, Scottish band manager Anthony "Tony" McGill. She announced on 18 August 2021 that she had given birth to their son.

In an interview, Balfe was asked if she considered herself spiritual. Balfe responded "I would say I'm spiritual, though have long turned my back on institutionalised religion. I definitely believe in the inherent goodness of the universe."

Philanthropy and other ventures 
She is a patron of the organisation World Child Cancer. In April 2018, she ran the London Marathon, raising over US$41,000 in support of the organisation.

She is also a supporter of charitable causes involving refugee relief with ChooseLove, raising thousands of dollars in funds to help aid refugees in crisis globally, as well as a vocal supporter of charities that aid the environment. In October 2020, an annual birthday fundraising initiative called Project CaiTREEna was started by fans to raise money for the environmental charity One Tree Planted. To date over US$150,000 has been raised in her honour, resulting in over 150,000 trees being planted around the world. 

In August 2020, Balfe launched Forget Me Not, a Scottish-based small batch gin with 25% of the proceeds funding arts programmes.

Filmography

Film

Television

Awards and nominations

References

External links

1979 births
Irish female models
Irish film actresses
Irish television actresses
Living people
Former Roman Catholics
Irish former Christians
Irish expatriates in the United States
Irish expatriates in the United Kingdom
People from County Monaghan
21st-century Irish actresses
Actresses from Dublin (city)
Models from Dublin (city)